Lawrence Cohen Walker III (born June 17, 1965) is an American politician, currently serving as a member of the Georgia State Senate from the 20th district. A member of the Republican Party, he won a special election in December 2015 to succeed Ross Tolleson, who resigned for health reasons.

Walker's father, Larry Walker, served more than thirty years in the Georgia House of Representatives, almost half of which as majority leader.

References

External links
 Official Page at the Georgia General Assembly

Georgia (U.S. state) Republicans
21st-century American politicians
People from Perry, Georgia
Living people
1965 births